Özbek is a village in Tarsus district of Mersin Province, Turkey. The population of Özbek was 1011  as of 2011.

References

Villages in Tarsus District